Eija Krogerus (19 June 1932 – 7 October 2018) was a former bowler who was well known in Finland. She played in the National Team continuously for 21 years, from 1962 until 1983.

She has won medals and success on national, Nordic and international levels, excelling in World and European Championships.  She played in six World Championships, five European Championships and eleven times in Nordic Championships and retired from the National Team after the European Cup Individual 1983.

She was born in Helsinki.

She competed in the 1972 AMF World Cup held in Magallanes, Philippines and voted "Sportswoman of the Year".

Krogerus was inducted into the WBW International Bowling Hall of Fame in 2002, almost twenty years after retiring from competitive bowling at 51 years of age.

References

External links

1932 births
2018 deaths
Sportspeople from Helsinki
Finnish ten-pin bowling players